Rathke is a surname. Notable people with the surname include:

Martin Rathke (1793–1860), German embryologist and anatomist
Bernhard Rathke, German chemist, son of Martin
Wade Rathke, founder and former Chief Organizer of Association of Community Organizations for Reform Now (ACORN)